Somatochlora lingyinensis is a species of dragonfly in the family Corduliidae. It was described in 1979 based on a specimen from Lingyin in Zhejiang, China. No other specimens are known.

References

Corduliidae
Odonata of Asia
Insects of China
Endemic fauna of Zhejiang
Insects described in 1979